Corinth is an unincorporated community in Leon County, Texas, United States. Corinth was founded in the late 1800s and named for Biblical Corinth. By the 1900s, Corinth had a school, a church, and several businesses; in 1910, a telephone company opened in the community. The school closed in the late twentieth century, and by 2000 Corinth had no businesses or churches and consisted mainly of scattered ranches.

References

Unincorporated communities in Leon County, Texas
Unincorporated communities in Texas